Fibuloides levatana is a moth of the family Tortricidae. It is known from China (Zhejiang, Fujian) and Vietnam.

References

Enarmoniini
Moths described in 1997